Keeseekoose 66-CA-04 is an Indian reserve of the Keeseekoose First Nation in Saskatchewan. It is 39 kilometres east of Yorkton. In the 2016 Canadian Census, it recorded a population of 0 living in 0 of its 1 total private dwellings.

References

Indian reserves in Saskatchewan
Division No. 9, Saskatchewan